Chiroscience Group Plc was a British-based biotech company, founded by Christopher Evans. The company was taken over by Celltech in 1999, which was acquired in 2004 by UCB.

History
Chiroscience was born from the demise of the company Enzymatix, which was ultimately acquired by Genzyme, when Andrew Richards joined the company and convinced Evans and Peter Keen to launch Chiros, which name was quickly revised to Chrioscience. Chiroscience became one of the first biotechnology Initial Public Offerings in the United Kingdom in 1994.

In 1996, the company merged with the American biotech company Darwin Molecular Corporation, based in Cambridge, Massachusetts, retaining Chiroscience as its name.

By the time of its merger with Celltech in 1999, both Chris Evans and Peter Keen had left the company, leaving Andrew Richards as the sole remaining founder and member of the original management board.

See also
Chirocaine, an anesthetic developed by Chiroscience
Romosozumab, discovered by Chiroscience before its acquisition by Celltech
Pharmaceutical industry in the United Kingdom

References and notes

Further reading 

   This shows performance of stock from May 1995 to May 1996.
  Contains a graphic showing company stock performance across 1994 to 1996.

External links
 UCB Group website

Pharmaceutical companies of the United Kingdom